The 2003 1000 km of Spa was the sixth race for the 2003 FIA Sportscar Championship season (running under SR1 and SR2 classes) and the ninth race for the 2003 British GT Championship season (running under GTO and GT Cup classes), running in combination at the Circuit de Spa-Francorchamps.  It took place on August 31, 2003.

Official results
Class winners in bold.  Cars failing to complete 75% of winner's distance marked as Not Classified (NC).

Statistics
 Pole Position - #25 Audi Sport Japan Team Goh - 2:14.889
 Fastest Lap - #25 Audi Sport Japan Team Goh - 2:18.074
 Average Speed - 172.558 km/h

References

Spa
Spa
6 Hours of Spa-Francorchamps